The 2011 Philadelphia Union season was the second season of the team's existence, competing in Major League Soccer, the top flight of American soccer. The team was managed by former MLS player Peter Nowak, in his second season with the club.

Background

At the end of the 2010 season, Philadelphia was 7th in the Eastern Conference, which unfortunately was not enough to get them into the MLS Playoffs. During the off-season, the team lost Fred, Seitz, Salinas, and Moreno through re-entry and expansion drafts. The Union did acquire 2 new players before the 2011 SuperDraft in January: one through trade (Brian Carroll from Columbus Crew) and their first homegrown player (Zach Pfeffer). In the MLS SuperDraft, Philadelphia had selected three new players for the team: Zac MacMath (GK from University of Maryland and 5th pick overall), Michael Farfan (M from University of North Carolina, 23rd overall) and Levi Houapeu (F from University of Maryland, Baltimore County, 41st overall). During the Supplemental Draft, the Union picked up another 3 players: Ryan Richter (MF/F), Josh Walburn (D) and Matt Marcin (MF).

Shortly after the SuperDraft, the team released MF Toni Ståhl, who had only played a handful of minutes with the team in 2010, and was sent off in the first game of the season with 2 yellow cards. Toward the end of January, Philadelphia released their other goalie from the 2010 season, Brad Knighton.

On 20 January, Philadelphia introduced two new players: Colombians Faryd Mondragón (GK) and Carlos Valdés (D). Mondragón had recently come from playing with F.C. Cologne in the German Bundesliga, and has at least 50 caps with the Colombia nationaltTeam. Valdés comes from Club Independiente Santa Fe in the Colombian First Division, where he served as captain before coming to Philadelphia.

On 11 January, the Union became the 13th team in the MLS to gain a shirt sponsor. Bimbo Bakeries USA will sponsor the team in exchange for US$12 million (three million for four years). Bimbo Bakeries has sponsored other teams in Mexico and Costa Rica, but this is their first time in the MLS.

Review

Preseason
Philadelphia Union will play their first pre-season game against the U-17 US Men National Team on 6 February. They will then play two friendlies against university teams, University of South Florida and University of Central Florida, on 10 February and 13 February respectively. Their last pre-season game in Orlando will be against Orlando City, a new team in the USL Professional Division, on 19 February.

The club announced the signing of former MLS Most Valuable Player Carlos Ruiz on 22 February.

March
Philadelphia Union's first game will be away against Houston Dynamo on 19 March. Their first home game at PPL Park will be against the Vancouver Whitecaps on 26 March.

April

May

June

July

August

September

October

2011 roster
As of September 23, 2011.

Match results

Preseason friendlies

MLS regular season

The Union are 11-8-15 overall, 7-1-9 at home, 4-7-6 on the road.

MLS Cup Playoffs

U.S. Open Cup

Friendlies

MLS Reserve League 

The Union Reserves are 2-7-1 overall, 2-3-0 at home, 0-4-1 on the road.

League table

Conference

Overall

Results summary

Squad information

Squad breakdown

Ages are as of March 19, 2011 (the date of their season opener).

Statistics

Statistics are from all MLS league matches.

* = Not currently part of team.

Goalkeepers

* = Not currently part of team.

MLS Cup Playoffs Squad information

Statistics

Statistics are from all MLS Cup Playoffs matches.

Goalkeepers

Honors and awards

MLS Player of the Month

MLS Player of the Week

MLS Goal of the Week

MLS Team of the Week

MLS All-Stars 2011

Player movement

Transfers

In

Out

Loans

In

Out

Miscellany

Allocation ranking 
Philadelphia is in the #17 position in the MLS Allocation Ranking. The allocation ranking is the mechanism used to determine which MLS club has first priority to acquire a U.S. National Team player who signs with MLS after playing abroad, or a former MLS player who returns to the league after having gone to a club abroad for a transfer fee. Philadelphia started 2011 ranked #5 on the allocation list and used its ranking to acquire Freddy Adu. A ranking can be traded, provided that part of the compensation received in return is another club's ranking.

International roster spots 
Philadelphia has 8 international roster spots. Each club in Major League Soccer is allocated 8 international roster spots, which can be traded. Philadelphia has not dealt or acquired any spots in trades. There is no limit on the number of international slots on each club's roster. The remaining roster slots must belong to domestic players. For clubs based in the United States, a domestic player is either a U.S. citizen, a permanent resident (green card holder) or the holder of other special status (e.g., refugee or asylum status).

Future draft pick trades 
Future picks acquired: 2012 SuperDraft Round 2 pick acquired from Sporting Kansas City; 2013 SuperDraft Round 2 pick acquired from FC Dallas.
Future picks traded: None.

References

External links
 Philadelphia Union website

2011
American soccer clubs 2011 season
2011 Major League Soccer season
2011 in sports in Pennsylvania